The Commonwealth Veteran Fencing Championships is a sport-specific event held in the Commonwealth of Nations. It is an age-restricted event for fencers aged 40 and above, organised by the Commonwealth Veterans Fencing Association in cooperation with the Commonwealth Fencing Federation. The first championships were held in 1995 and subsequently held on each odd-numbered year until 2009. From 2010, the event timing was changed to occur on even-numbered years so every second event coincides with the Commonwealth Fencing Championships and Commonwealth Games.

Loughborough 1995
The first championships were held in Loughborough, England. Five countries competed: Canada, England, Isle of Man, Northern Ireland and Wales.

Isle of Man 1997
The second championships were held in the Isle of Man. Seven countries competed: Alderney, England, Isle of Man, Northern Ireland, Scotland, South Africa and Wales.

Johannesburg 1999
The third championships were held in Johannesburg, South Africa. Six countries competed: Australia, England, Isle of Man, Scotland, South Africa, Wales.

Wrexham 2001
The fourth championships were held in Wrexham, North Wales. Nine countries competed: Australia, Canada, England, Guernsey, Northern Ireland, Scotland, South Africa and Wales.

Sydney 2003
The fifth championships were held in Sydney, Australia. Eight countries competed: Australia, England, Isle of Man, Jersey, New Zealand, Scotland, South Africa and Wales.

Edinburgh 2005
The sixth championships were held in Edinburgh, Scotland. Nine countries competed: Australia, Canada, England, Isle of Man, New Zealand, Northern Ireland, Scotland, South Africa and Wales.

Toronto 2007
The seventh championships were held in Toronto, Canada. Seven countries competed: Australia, Canada, England, Isle of Man, Northern Ireland, Scotland and Wales.

St Helier 2009
The eighth championships were held in St Helier, Jersey. Twelve countries competed: Australia, Canada, England, Guernsey, Isle of Man, Jersey, New Zealand, Northern Ireland, Scotland, Singapore, South Africa and Wales.

Melbourne 2010
The ninth championships were held in Melbourne,  Victoria, Australia from 30 September to 5 October 2010. This was the first such event to be held in conjunction with the tenth Commonwealth Fencing Championships. In the veterans' events, 85 competitors took part from twelve countries: Australia, Canada, England, Guernsey, Isle of Man, Jersey, New Zealand, Northern Ireland, Scotland, Singapore, South Africa and Wales.

Singapore 2012
The tenth championships were held in Singapore from 27 to 30 September 2012. There were 157 individual entries and 25 team entries from eleven countries: Australia, Canada, England, Guernsey, Isle of Man, Jersey, Malaysia, New Zealand, Scotland, Singapore and Wales.

Largs 2014
The eleventh championships are held in Largs, near Glasgow, Scotland from 16 to 19 November 2014. Northern Irish competitor Gillian Robinson was one of only 3 gold medals won by Northern Ireland at the 2014 Commonwealth Games.

External links
 Commonwealth Fencing Federation
 Commonwealth Fencing Federation veteran past events
 Commonwealth Veteran Fencing Championships 2009
 Commonwealth Fencing Championships and Commonwealth Veteran Fencing Championships 2010
 Commonwealth Veteran Fencing Championships 2012
 Commonwealth Veteran Fencing Championships 2014

Fencing
C
Senior sports competitions